Angry Babies in Love is a 2014 Malayalam romantic comedy film directed by Saji Surendran and scripted by Krishna Poojappura. It stars Anoop Menon and Bhavana. The film, produced by Darshan Ravi under the banner of Demac Creations, has music composed by Bijibal and cinematography by Anil Nair. The film was released on 14 June 2014 and received mixed reviews from critics. The music label for the movie is Muzik247

Plot
Jeevan Paul is a still photographer who runs a studio in a village in Idukki. By accident, he meets Sarah Thomas, a girl from a good family, and they fall in love. The plot starts when Sarah is at church, about to marry a man who was chosen from her parents but Jeevan who was one of photographers steps up and claims that Sarah loves him and this marriage shouldn't happen. Sarah's family oppose her relationship with Jeevan, so they elope and move away, settling in Mumbai. A year later they appear in court seeking a divorce. The court orders them to stay together for another six months.

Cast
 Anoop Menon as Jeevan Paul
 Bhavana as Sarah Thomas
 Anusree as Selvi
 Arun as Deepak
 Nishanth Sagar as Anwar
 Parvathy Nair as Paro
 P. Balachandran as Madhavan
 Noby Marcose as Kochu kunju
 Joju George as Alex Maliyekkal
 Muktha
 Aditi Ravi as Maria
 Romanch as Salman
 Kalabhavan Shaju as Sreedhar

Reception
 The Times of India gave the film 3 stars out of 5 and wrote, "The film will certainly come across as a pleasant watch for families who would enjoy certain situations in the film, but as a mass entertainer, it might fall a bit short". Nowrunning.com gave 2 stars out of 5 and wrote, "Playing out on the trouble that brews in a marital paradise, Angry Babies sings a familiar tune, is sporadically funny and makes little attempts whatsoever to take a detour from a much beaten path".

Soundtrack 
The film's soundtrack contains 4 songs, all composed by Bijibal. Lyrics by Anoop Menon And Rajeev Alunkal

References

External links
 

2014 films
2010s Malayalam-language films
2014 romantic comedy films
Indian romantic comedy films
Films shot in Mumbai
Films shot in Munnar
Films directed by Saji Surendran